Nicole Schupf is an American epidemiologist and neuroscientist who is Professor of Epidemiology in Neurology, Psychiatry, the Gertrude H. Sergievsky Center, and the Taub Institute for Research on Alzheimer's Disease and the Aging Brain, Columbia University Faculty of Medicine. She studies aging and Alzheimer's disease in individuals with Down syndrome.

Education and early career 
Schupf graduated from Bryn Mawr College in 1964. She received her Ph.D. from New York University in 1970, trained as a physiological psychologist. She worked on neuroimmunological mechanisms in lupus cerebritis for several years before going on to pursue an M.P.H. from the University of California in 1984 and a Dr.P.H. in epidemiology from Columbia University, which she received in 1995.

Career 
Schupf is Professor of Epidemiology in Neurology, Psychiatry, the Gertrude H. Sergievsky Center, and the Taub Institute for Research on Alzheimer's Disease and the Aging Brain, Columbia University Faculty of Medicine. She studies aging and Alzheimer's disease (AD) in individuals with Down syndrome (DS), looking at genetic and nongenetic factors that can influence degree of risk or age at onset. She is involved in longitudinal, multidisciplinary work searching for biomarkers that could define the progression of AD in this population. This wide-ranging investigation includes blood-based biomarkers (like beta-amyloid peptides, protein, inflammatory and lipid profiles); measures of amyloid and tau concentration in cerebrospinal fluid; changes detected with neuroimaging; PET studies of brain amyloid uptake; and genetic variations. She has been a major recipient of National Institutes of Health and other federal grant-makers for this research.

Selected publications

Personal life 
Schupf was married to H. Jack Geiger from 1982 until his death in 2020.

References

Columbia University faculty
American neuroscientists
Columbia University alumni
American women epidemiologists
American epidemiologists
University of California alumni
New York University alumni
Alzheimer's disease researchers
American women neuroscientists